Daniel G. Chichester (born August 22, 1964) is an American comic book writer. His credits include Daredevil and Nick Fury: Agent of S.H.I.E.L.D. for Marvel Comics.

Career
D. G. Chichester was born in Connecticut, and studied filmmaking at New York University. In his junior year, after running through cash reserves on his narrative student film, he took a job as assistant to the assistant of editor in chief Jim Shooter. This led to an editorial job at the Marvel Comics imprint Epic Comics following his graduation. Working as an assistant editor from 1985 to 1986, he was promoted to editor in 1987. Chichester worked in that capacity at Epic until 1989. He left Marvel's staff that year to pursue freelance writing and editing full-time. 

Beginning in 1987, Chichester added to his editorial role and began writing comics for Marvel — and, after leaving staff, for other publishers. His credits include Nick Fury: Agent of S.H.I.E.L.D. in 1990–1992, and Nightstalkers in 1992-1993. He had a long run on Daredevil from 1991 to 1995, where he scripted the "Fall of the Kingpin" and "Fall From Grace" story arcs. Additional freelance credits from this period include Charlemagne #1–5 for Defiant Comics and Motorhead #1–6 for Dark Horse Comics.

In early 1995, while in the midst of developing upcoming story lines for Daredevil, he learned he was to be replaced by group editor Bobbie Chase as the title's writer. For the five issues of the comic he was obligated to write he took his name off the credits, instead demanding an "Alan Smithee" credit (an official pseudonym used by film directors who wish to disown a project). Despite being fired from the title, Chichester was later given the opportunity to write the 1997 Daredevil/Batman intercompany crossover, "An Eye for an Eye", and accepted.

Chichester has had no major comics writing credits since 1999, the same year he joined the advertising agency Ogilvy & Mather as an associate creative director. Chichester is currently the Chief Experience Officer (CXO) for the Ogilvy Health division of Ogilvy & Mather based in both New York City and Parsippany, New Jersey.

He lives in Connecticut with his wife and son, continuing to experiment with moviemaking and animation.

Bibliography

Acclaim Comics
 Bloodshot #11–12 (1998)
 Homelands on the World of Magic: the Gathering (Armada, 1996)
 Sliders #1–3 (1996-1997)
 Sliders: Darkest Hour #1–3 (1996)
 Sliders: Ultimatum #1–2 (1996)

Dark Horse Comics
 Dark Horse Presents #139–140 (1999)
 King Tiger & Motorhead #1–2 (1996)
 Motorhead #1–6 (1995–1996)

DC Comics
 Batman 80-Page Giant #2 (1999)
 Judge Dredd: Legends of the Law #5–7 (1995)

Milestone Media
 Blood Syndicate #31–32 (1995)
 Hardware #45–50 (1996–1997)
 Long, Hot Summer #1–3 (1995)

Defiant Comics
 Charlemagne #1–5 (1994)

First Comics
 Moby Dick (1990)

Marvel Comics

 Blood and Glory: Punisher/Captain America #1–3 (1992)
 Daredevil #292–309, #312–332, #338–342, #380 (1991–1998)
 Elektra: Root of Evil #1–4 (1995)
 Justice #12 (1987)
 Marvel Super Heroes vol. 2 #1–2 (1990)
 Midnight Sons Unlimited #1, 4 (1993–1994)
 Nick Fury: Agent of S.H.I.E.L.D. #7–10, 15–23, 25–31 (1990–1992)
 Nightstalkers #1–11 (1992–1993)
 Punisher/Black Widow: Spinning Doomsday's Web (graphic novel, 1992)
 Punisher Annual #4 (1991)
 Solo Avengers #10 (1988)
 Spider-Man storyline #15: Doom Control (Marvel CyberComics, 1998)
 Terror Inc. #1–13 (1992–1993)
 West Coast Avengers #38 (1988)
 What If...? vol. 2 #73 (1995)
 Wolverine #58–59 (1992)

Epic Comics
 Clive Barker's Hellraiser #5–16, 19, Summer Special #1 (1990–1992)
 Doctor Zero #1–7 (1988–1989)
 Hellraiser Nightbreed-Jihad #1–2 (1991)
 Powerline #1–8 (1988–1989)
 St. George #1–8 (1988–1989)
 Shadowline Saga: Critical Mass #1–7 (1990)

Marvel Comics and DC Comics
 Assassins #1 (Amalgam Comics, 1996)
 Daredevil/Batman: Eye for an Eye #1 (1997)

References

External links
 
 
 
 D. G. Chichester at Mike's Amazing World of Comics 
 D. G. Chichester at the Unofficial Handbook of Marvel Comics Creators  

1964 births
American comics writers
Chief digital officers
Comic book editors
Living people
Marvel Comics writers
New York University alumni
Writers from Connecticut